Webheads (originally titled as Go Viral while in development) is an American children's game show on Nickelodeon, hosted by former Big Time Rush star and band member Carlos PenaVega. The series aired on Nickelodeon from June 2 to July 3, 2014, and on Nicktoons from September 14 to October 9, 2015.

Format
Four contestants compete in a series of viral video viewing challenges.

Round 1: Buffering
Four videos are shown and on each video, it will pause at some point near the end. A question is then asked and the contestants are given three possible answers. Their job is to secretly pick the right one. The first video is worth 1 point, the second is worth 2, the third is worth 3, and the last video is worth 5 points. The maximum point total is 11 points. The player with the lowest score gets eliminated from the game, rides in the Surf the Web area, and receives a consolation prize.

Round 2: Memory Overload
The surviving three players have their scores reset to zero. The contestants are placed on an apparatus (either a large wheel that scrolls or a shaking trackpad). As they exercise on it, a series of videos are shown. When each video is finished, Carlos will start asking questions about the videos. On each question, the players must then buzz in (by hitting one of three buttons that would light up) the answer for the question. If one contestant is wrong, then another contestant would answer. Again, point values increase throughout the round. The first two videos have two questions each. The first pair is worth 10 and the second pair is worth 20. The last video has only one question, but it is worth 30 points. The maximum point total is 90 points. Again, the player with the lowest score is eliminated from the game and the two surviving players move on to the final round.

Tiebreaker: Video Remix
If there is a tie for the lowest score in the first two rounds, then the tied players play a game called "Video Remix". To start, a question is asked about a video where a certain part would play over and over again. The video would then play after the tied players locked in how many times that portion would play. The actual number would then be revealed and whoever has the closest guess advanced to the next round.

Round 3: Moment of Impact
Up to three videos are shown, and each one will be played twice. On the first play, the surviving two players will watch the video and indicate the moment of impact with a horn sound. On the second play, they will try to buzz in at the moment of impact. The player closest to buzzing in at the moment of the impact wins the video. Two videos will let them win the game and advance to the bonus round, while the other player gets eliminated, along with the player eliminated in round two, but the contestant in round three receives a consolation prize.

Bonus Round: Trending Now/The Spinning Wheel of Doom
During the final commercial break, the audience ranks four of the videos shown on that day's show from worst to best. Before the round starts, the player is shown the four videos that were voted on in random order. The player's job is to guess the correct ranking order by grabbing four tablets, representing the four clips one at a time, taking each in a spinning obstacle course called the Spinning Wheel of Doom consisting of several hurdles and a wall, and placing them in what they think is the proper order. When they are done, they press the button on the podium and Carlos tells them how many they got right (similar to the "Race Game" on The Price is Right). After the first check out, the wall opens and will stay open for the rest of the round. On the second check out, Carlos tells the player that one of the videos in the correct position is right and would not need to change it. If the player can place them in the right order in 90 seconds or less, they win the grand prize and get to ride the "Slime Wave". When they get all four right, confetti would get shot out. If not, they receive a consolation prize and get sprayed with water.

The Surf the Web Area
After each round, the eliminated players (including the one who lost the bonus round) get to ride a surfboard barefoot while wearing goggles and getting sprayed with water, while the grand prize winner would ride the "Slime Wave", featuring the trademark Nickelodeon slime.

Episodes

References

External links
 (archived)

2014 American television series debuts
2015 American television series endings
2010s American children's game shows
2010s American comedy game shows
2010s Nickelodeon original programming
English-language television shows
Nickelodeon game shows
Television series by Ryan Seacrest Productions